A song slide was a slide with the lyrics of a popular song projected in a movie house or vaudeville house. Typically, a live pianist would play the music, sometimes accompanied by a soloist, and the audience would join in the chorus. As a variation, a photograph of a model would appear along with the lyrics.

In movies during the silent film era. They served as additional entertainment, after the fashion of vaudeville before or between the films.

References

Vaudeville